Flight to Japan is an album led by the pianist Duke Jordan, recorded in 1976 in Tokyo and released on the Danish SteepleChase label in 1978.

Reception

AllMusic awarded the album 3 stars.

Track listing
All compositions by Duke Jordan except as indicated
 "Lullaby of the Orient" - 6:12
 "Bridgetown" - 3:50
 "The Bullet" - 3:41
 "Love Hotel" - 5:27
 "Stone Wall Blues" - 5:14
 "I Can't Get Started" (Vernon Duke, Ira Gershwin) - 9:29
 "Flight to Japan" - 4:47
 "Table Chess" - 3:56 Bonus track on CD release

Personnel
Duke Jordan - piano
Wilbur Little - double bass 
Roy Haynes - drums

References

1978 albums
Duke Jordan albums
SteepleChase Records albums